Events from the year 1576 in Ireland.

Incumbent
Monarch: Elizabeth I

Events
March 9 – Walter Devereux, Earl of Essex, is appointed Earl Marshal of Ireland.
April – Sir Henry Sidney, Lord Deputy of Ireland, shires Connacht into Galway, Mayo, Roscommon and Sligo.
June – the rebel sons of Richard Burke, Earl of Clanricarde, attack Athenry. They are captured and imprisoned in Dublin but escape.
June 20 – Sir William Drury is appointed President of Munster.
September – the Earl of Essex returns to Dublin but dies within three weeks of dysentery.

Births
Approximate date – Anthony Lynch, Dominican (d. after 1636)

Deaths
September 22 – Walter Devereux, Earl of Essex, Earl Marshal of Ireland (b. 1541)

References

1570s in Ireland
Years of the 16th century in Ireland